Amersfoort Centraal is the main railway station in Amersfoort in the province of Utrecht, Netherlands. The station was an important link between the western part of the Netherlands and the north and east of the country until December 2012 when the Hanzelijn opened.

History

The original station building opened on 20 August 1863, and closed in 1904. This first station opened as part of the Utrecht–Kampen railway ("Centraalspoorweg"), which runs from Utrecht via Amersfoort to Zwolle and Kampen.

In 1874 the Gooilijn opened, running from Amsterdam via Hilversum to Amersfoort. Two years later the line was extended to form the Oosterspoorweg ("East rail line") from Amersfoort to Apeldoorn and Zutphen. In 1886 a railway line opened from Amersfoort to Kesteren, offering a direct service between Amsterdam and Nijmegen. However, the 1863 station was just too far east for the line, and so another station was built on the Kesteren line, called Amersfoort Stad. Parts of the Kesteren line still exist today. To permit connections between the two stations, a third station was built, called Amersfoort Aansluiting (“Amersfoort Connection”). Because this meant there were three stations all close to each other, it was decided to consolidate them and the current station was built and opened in 1901. It was renovated in 1997, at which time a third island-platform, as well as an exit on the north side of the station, were built.

Since 1970, Amersfoort has been important for intercity passengers, as it was the only station where all cross country intercity trains from Amsterdam, The Hague and Rotterdam to Leeuwarden, Groningen and Enschede met. Passengers only need to cross to the other side of an island platform to change for trains to other destinations. Since December 2012 and the opening of the Hanzelijn, trains from The Hague and Amsterdam now travel via Lelystad to Zwolle, avoiding Amersfoort.

A second station was opened in Amersfoort in 1987, called Amersfoort Schothorst, and in 2006 a third was opened, Amersfoort Vathorst. Both these stations are on the Amersfoort – Zwolle line.

The Centraalspoorweg between Amersfoort and Zwolle is also known as the Veluwelijn.

A new fly-under was opened on 18 October 2013, after two years of construction, to allow trains from Hilversum to access Platform 1 without crossing the other lines. The cost was €44.5 million.

Train services
, the following train services call at this station:
Express services:
International Intercity: Amsterdam - Amersfoort - Hengelo - Osnabrück - Hanover - Berlin
Intercity: Schiphol - Hilversum - Amersfoort - Hengelo - Enschede
Intercity: Schiphol - Hilversum - Amersfoort - Amersfoort Schothorst
Intercity: Amsterdam - Hilversum - Amersfoort (- Deventer)
Intercity: Rotterdam - Utrecht - Amersfoort - Zwolle - Groningen
Intercity: Rotterdam - Utrecht - Amersfoort - Zwolle - Leeuwarden
Intercity: The Hague - Utrecht - Amersfoort - Hengelo - Enschede
Intercity: The Hague - Utrecht - Amersfoort - Amersfoort Schothorst
Local services:
Sprinter: Utrecht - Amersfoort - Zwolle
Sprinter: Hoofddorp - Amsterdam - Hilversum - Amersfoort Vathorst
Stoptrein: Amersfoort - Barneveld - Ede-Wageningen
Stoptrein: Amersfoort - Barneveld Zuid

Bus services
Bus services depart from the bus station at the front of the station; services are operated by Syntus and U-OV (52, 72).

1: Park Bilthoven - Soesterkwartier/Isselt - Station
2: Station - Nieuwland
3: Station - Vathorst
4: Station - Hoogland - Kattenbroek
5: Station - City Centre - Schothorst - Vathorst
6: Station - City Centre - Rustenburg - Liendert
7: Station - Schothorst - Vathorst
8: Station - City Centre - Vermeerkwartier - Schullenburg
9 Station - Leusderkwartier - Eemgaarde
17: Amersfoort - Leusden
19: Station - Rusthof Cemetery
52: Amersfoort - Soesterberg - Huis ter Heide - Zeist North - De Bilt - Utrecht
56: Amersfoort - Soesterberg - Huis ter Heide - Zeist - Driebergen-Zeist - Doorn - Wijk bij Duurstede
70: Amersfoort - Soest Zuid - Soestdijk North - Hilversum
72: Amersfoort - Soesterberg - Zeist - Utrecht
76: Amersfoort - Bunschoten - Spakenburg
(X)80: Amersfoort - Leusden South - Woudenberg - Scherpenzeel - Veenendaal - Rhenen
82: Amersfoort - Leusden South - Woudenberg - Maarn - Doorn
102: Amersfoort - Hoevelaken - Zwartebroek - Terschuur - Voorthuizen - Nieuw Millingen - Apeldoorn
217: Amersfoort - Leusden
280: Amersfoort - Leusden South - Woudenberg - Maarsbergen - Veenendaal
356 Amersfoort -  Soesterberg, National Military Museum

References

External links

NS website 
Dutch public transport travel planner 
Live departures 

Centraal
Railway stations opened in 1863
Railway stations opened in 1901
Railway stations on the Centraalspoorweg
Railway stations on the Valleilijn
Railway stations on the Veluwelijn